is a Pokémon species in Nintendo and Game Freak's Pokémon franchise, introduced in Pokémon X and Pokémon Y, that has since appeared across a wide variety of Pokémon media. It is the final evolution of Froakie, the Water-type starter Pokémon of X and Y, with either the ability 'Torrent' or 'Protean', with 'Battle Bond' as an event ability, enabling it to become Ash-Greninja, and the immediate evolution of Frogadier. Ash-Greninja has increased speed. Categorized as the "Ninja Pokémon", Greninja is a Water- and Dark-type Pokémon who is a frog-like master of swiftness and stealth.

It appeared prominently in the XYZ series of the Pokémon anime as one of Ash Ketchum's primary Pokémon, voiced by Yūji Ueda. This Greninja used its bond with Ash to transform into a unique and powerful form, Ash-Greninja, which was later released to the games as an empowered form of Greninja accessible to players of the Pokémon Sun and Moon Special Demo Version. Greninja was introduced as a playable fighter to the Super Smash Bros. franchise with Super Smash Bros. for Nintendo 3DS and Wii U as one of the Pokémon series' five representatives, and was integrated into manga such as Pokémon Adventures.
Greninja also appeared in Super Smash Bros. Ultimate on the Nintendo Switch. 
Greninja has been met with a very positive reception, quickly becoming one of the most popular Pokémon of the sixth generation, and of all time in the 2020 vote with 140559 votes, because of its endearing design and strength in competitive play. However, its reappearance in Pokémon Scarlet and Violet received a more polarising response, due to the alterations made to the ability, Protean, as well as its special ability Battle Bond, which can no longer change Greninja into its Ash-Greninja form. Its popularity has resulted in its integration into various merchandising and promotions of the Pokémon franchise.

Concept and characteristics
Greninja is a streamlined frog-like creature with dark blue skin and a beige underbelly, with long limbs and thin, slender physique particularly reminiscent of tree frogs. What resembles a pink scarf is actually its prehensile tongue wrapped around its head. Two long, ear-like protrusions extend from both sides of its head and connect with a smaller horn-like structure in the middle by azure blue-colored webbing. Spots of the same azure coloring can be found on each thigh, arguably resembling ninja stars or battle scars along with a stubby tail that wraps inwards. Much like a frog, Greninja has webbed feet, wall-clinging suction cups on each digit, and powerful hind legs. It shoots streams of compressed water patterns from its palms. A large bubble can be found on each limb. A bipedal creature, Greninja can comfortably stand on its hind legs, but leans on one of its front limbs in a crouching stance when in battle. When at rest its eyes are white with hyphen-shaped pupils, but when engaged they gain red, oval-shapes irises, white pupils, and a narrow gaze. It only weighs 88.2 lbs. (40 kg), but is still quite tall at 4' 11" (1.5 m).

It shares a motif of role-playing game classes with its Grass-type (Chesnaught) and Fire-type (Delphox) counterparts; while the former resemble a knight and witch respectively, Greninja draws heavy inspiration from the ninja. In Japan, frogs and toads have long been associated with ninjutsu through the folk story "The Tale of the Gallant Jiraiya" (児雷也豪傑物語 Jiraiya Gōketsu Monogatari), a story about a ninja who can shapeshift into a large toad.

Greninja is able to move with "a ninja's grace", and has a design and set of abilities associated with Ninjutsu. Among its attacks are the formerly exclusive Water Shuriken, which lets it quickly fire throwing stars made from compressed water, Shadow Sneak, and Double Team. It is also the only Pokémon to learn Mat Block, which shields the user's side with a flipped-up mat. The Protean ability, which lets the user camouflage to the type of the attack it uses, is exclusive to Greninja and the chameleon Pokémon Kecleon (as well as the former's pre-evolutions). Capable of vanishing and reappearing quickly, it enjoys toying with enemies in such a manner. It is very adaptable, learning many moves such as Bounce, Extrasensory, and Low Kick from different types.

Greninja's stealth and swiftness are unique among Water-type starters, contrasting with previous designs like Blastoise and Swampert. It shoots jets of compressed water from its hands, as opposed to many other Water-types that shoot water from their mouths. It was created by Yusuke Ohmura, who designed the Water-type starters of the previous two generations as well as the mascot creatures for X and Y, Xerneas and Yveltal. Greninja's design was finalized by Ken Sugimori, Game Freak's art director.

As Pokémon X and Y take place in Kalos, a fictional region inspired by France, Greninja's name combines the French word for frog (grenouille) and "ninja". It is used for the English, Spanish, and Italian localizations of X and Y. Ironically, a completely different name is used in the French localization, with "Amphinobi" combining the French word for amphibian (amphibie) and "shinobi". Its Japanese name is "Gekkouga", combining the Japanese word for croak (げこっ geko) and the Koga ninjutsu school (甲賀流 Kōga ryū).

Appearances

In video games

Pokémon game series
Greninja debuted in Pokémon X and Y, which was released internationally on October 12, 2013, for the Nintendo 3DS. As is the case for most Pokémon evolved from starters, Greninja is rare except for choosing Froakie at the game's beginning and fully training it. It can only be obtained otherwise by evolving a Friend Safari Frogadier, by fully evolving the Froakie named "Froabble" in-game rival Shauna trades to the player after the game's completion, if Fennekin was the chosen starter, or through trading with another player. It can be transferred to Omega Ruby and Alpha Sapphire through trade, or into Sun and Moon and Ultra Sun and Ultra Moon through the online storage system Pokémon Bank. Though very rare, Greninja has a Shiny variant obtainable in the games that is jet black with a red tongue.

Greninja has been incorporated in spin-off Pokémon games as well. In the action game Pokémon Rumble World, Greninja is the back boss of Dewdrop Bay's Castle Moat, and can be recruited as a playable character. It is the boss of Area 03's fifth stage in Pokémon Picross, of Renegade Meadow in puzzle game Pokémon Battle Trozei, and of Expert Stage 24 in Pokémon Shuffle. Through evolving the player character of Froakie, Greninja is playable in Pokémon Super Mystery Dungeon, and is even included on the game's box art. It also appeared in Pokémon Go, Pokémon UNITE, and Pokkén Tournament DX.

Other Nintendo games

Outside of the Pokémon series, Greninja also appears in Nintendo's Super Smash Bros. series. Greninja was included as a new fighter in Super Smash Bros. for Nintendo 3DS and Wii U in 2014, returning in Super Smash Bros. Ultimate in 2018. Greninja's inclusion was revealed during the Super Smash Bros. Direct on April 8, 2014, alongside returning characters Zero Suit Samus, Sheik, Yoshi, and fellow Pokémon Charizard. The game's director, Masahiro Sakurai, stated that he decided to include finishing development, and he working very closely with Game Freak's conceptual illustrations and making his own interpretations of the character. Its characteristics in the Pokémon games are reflected in Smash, being an agile fighter with ninja-like stealth capable of attacking opponents with water from its palms. Its final smash, Secret Ninja Attack, incorporates Greninja's signature move Mat Block. Its home stages include Prism Tower, the Pokémon Gym of Kalos' capital city on the 3DS version, and Kalos Pokémon League on the Wii U version. Ultimate granted Greninja its anime debuted Battle Bond form, “Ash-Greninja” as part of its Final Smash move, confirming the playable Greninja in this game series as a male.

In Super Mario Maker, by scanning a Greninja amiibo, the player can unlock a Mystery Mushroom for Greninja that can be used in the player's customizable levels. When Mario makes contact with the Mushroom, he takes on Greninja's likeness and animations until he finishes the level, makes contact with an enemy, or loses a life. Greninja has the same sound bits as Mario, instead of those from Pokémon games; this is also true for Pikachu, Charizard, Jigglypuff, Mewtwo and Lucario but not for Bulbasaur, Charmander or Squirtle.

In the anime

Multiple Greninja have made appearances in the XY series of the Pokémon anime. While the Pokémon was first alluded to in the episode "A Rush of Ninja Wisdom!", it made its formal debut in the 17th Pokémon movie, Diancie and the Cocoon of Destruction, under the ownership of a thieving ninja named Riot. Ippei and Sanpei, two recurring characters in the anime, both have a Greninja. They both chose Froakie as their starter in tribute to a folkloric Greninja that saved their home village. Series protagonist Ash Ketchum's Greninja is the most prominent; he first appeared as a Froakie in the first episode "Kalos, Where Dreams and Adventures Begin!", was caught by Ash in the following episode "Lumiose City Pursuit!", and evolved from Frogadier into Greninja in episode seven of XYZ, "A Festival of Decisions!". Uniquely, Greninja and Ash are able to temporarily link their consciousnesses during battle. When such an exchange occurs, the former physically morphs to somewhat resemble Ash, a form called "Ash-Greninja". However, while well received by fans, Ash-Greninja is the main reason why the writers failed to give Ash a genuine Mega-Evolved Pokémon until Journeys; the writers made Ash catch Generation VI only Pokémon in the XY series to promote the XY games, but the traditional concept of giving Ash current generation only Pokémon to promote the current generation games had worn out its welcome with fans. Greninja is also the first main protagonist owned Water-type Starter that fully evolved in the series because fans are sick of the overused concepts of not letting a main protagonist Water starter reach their final forms (Ash's Squirtle, Totodile and Oshawott, Dawn's Piplup, Brock's Marshtomp and May's Wartortle) and not letting six of Ash's Water-types fully evolve (Squirtle, Totodile, Oshawott, Corphish, Buizel and Palpitoad). In episode 46 of the XYZ season, "Facing the Needs of the Many!", Ash released Greninja in order to assist Zygarde and Squishy in destroying some of the remaining roots of the Giant Rock, which threatened to destroy Kalos and the whole world, symbolizing someday that Ash's Greninja will rejoin Ash in the future after all of the remaining roots of the Giant Rock are all destroyed. However, this decision resulted in a lot of controversy, with fans and critics alike labeling "Facing the Needs of the Many!" as the worst episode in Pokémon anime history. Greninja returned in Journeys after a long absence and reunites with Ash, while Squishy and the other Zygarde were already written out of this anime due to irrelevance. Greninja teaches Ash and his Mega Lucario new moves and how to boost up its aura powers. While the reunion episode is well received by fans, some are disappointed that Greninja did not officially rejoin Ash's team, unlike Ash's Charizard in the Black and White series. Additionally, Ash-Greninja did not appear in the episode, with flashback scenes featuring it having it omitted in favor of normal Greninja.

In live-action films
A band of Greninja appears in the live-action film Pokémon Detective Pikachu, but as minor antagonists working as hired guns for Clifford Enterprises against Tim Goodman, Harry Goodman as Detective Pikachu, and Lucy Stevens. Lucy's Psyduck manages to defeat them by using its full power. The Greninja had been stolen and brainwashed victims of illegal experimentation by the mastermind Howard Clifford.

Other media
Since its introduction, Greninja has regularly been featured in Pokémon merchandise. In the Pokémon Trading Card Game, Greninja-EX is one of the flagship cards associated with the Kalos Power Tin set and in promotion for BREAKpoint Wave Slasher Theme Deck. Ash-Greninja has also been incorporated into the trading card game and lineup of plushies. Key chains, soft toys, and figures of the Pokémon are all available on the online Pokémon Center store as well as in local toy store chains. Greninja was introduced among the fourth wave of amiibo, Nintendo's lineup of collectible toys-to-life figures. The figure is based on its appearance in Super Smash Bros. and is compatible with many different video games for the Wii U, Nintendo 3DS, and Nintendo Switch. Initially released on April 3, 2015, as a Toys "R" Us exclusive, Greninja proved to be so desirable that the figure sold out within just 30 minutes.

Reception
Greninja has proven to be one of the most popular Pokémon introduced in X and Y,  described as likely to be popular just from its design upon reveal. A 2016 Japan election held by The Pokémon Company determined that Greninja was the most popular Pokémon species in the country. Greninja was named the 2020 "Pokémon of the Year", based on results of a vote by fans in a poll run by Google and The Pokémon Company. Michael Derosa of Screen Rant called Greninja was one of the most popular Pokémon from the entire series, while Mic author Alex Borkowski described Ash-Greninja as "stylish." Kevin Slackie of Paste listed Greninja as 9th of the best Pokémon. Dale Bishir of IGN described Greninja as the most important Pokémon that impacted the franchise's history, and further stated that it rose through popularity to become one of the most beloved Pokémon of all time, getting its own slot in Super Smash Bros. and even getting its own Super Saiyan-like form. Steven Bogos of The Escapist listed Greninja as 30th of their favorite Pokémon, stating that its probably the most popular X and Y starter. It even managed to find its way into Super Smash Bros. 4. International Business Times cited Greninja as an example of best Pokémon design in Pokémon X and Y.

Reception to its inclusion in Super Smash Bros. has been mostly positive, with many online reviewers appreciating the uniqueness of the character and being genuinely surprised by its unveiling.  Gavin Jasper of Den of Geek ranked Greninja as 27th of Super Smash Bros. Ultimate characters, praising its design as fitting for such an "outrageous" game. Jeremy Parish of Polygon ranked 73 fighters from Super Smash Bros. Ultimate "from garbage to glorious", listing Greninja as 35th and stated that a frog ninja is a pretty heady character concept. In 2014, Ben Reeves of GameInformer claimed Greninja is the easily the best new Super Smash Bros. character. The inclusion of Greninja in the Detective Pikachu film also received praise for staying true to its ninja-like portrayal in the video games and anime, though some reviewers found its tongue scarf "disgusting" when rendered in CGI.

Merchandise
In 2015, an Amiibo of Greninja was made available at Toys 'R Us, Ash-Greninja figure and a plush of it was released during Pokémon's 25th anniversary.

References

External links
Greninja on Bulbapedia
Greninja on Pokemon.com

Fictional characters who can manipulate darkness or shadows
Fictional frogs
Fictional blade and dart throwers
Ninja characters in video games
Nintendo protagonists
Pokémon species
Super Smash Bros. fighters
Video game characters introduced in 2013
Video game characters with water abilities